Hain Ahmed Pasha ( Ahmed Pasha 'the Traitor'; died 1524), was an Ottoman governor (beylerbey) and a statesman, who became the Ottoman governor of Egypt Eyalet in 1523.

Early life
Ahmed Pasha was of Georgian origin. He was educated in the Enderun palace school.

Declaring himself the sultan of Egypt
Hain Ahmed Pasha wanted to become the grand vizier, to become the grand vizier, Hain Ahmed Pasha tried to persuade Suleiman the Magnificent to dismiss Piri Mehmed Pasha, using the old age of Piri Mehmed Pasha as an excuse, and ultimately succeeded. his rival Pargalı Ibrahim Pasha had been appointed (June 1523) instead as grand vizier, so Hain Ahmed Pasha offered Suleiman I. to make him the governor of Egypt Eyalet, which got accepted by Suleiman I. When Hain Ahmed Pasha went to Egypt, he declared himself the sultan of Egypt, independent from the Ottoman Empire. He struck coins with his own face and name in order to legitimize his power and captured Cairo Citadel and the local Ottoman garrisons in January 1524.

Death
After surviving an assassination attempt in his bath by two emirs that he had previously sacked, he fled Cairo. Ottoman authorities finally captured him and executed him by decapitation. His rebellion occasioned a short period of instability in the nascent Egypt Eyalet. After his death, his rival Pargalı İbrahim Pasha visited Egypt and reformed the provincial military and civil administration.

Family
Ahmed married Ilaldi Sultan, a daughter of Sultan Bayezid II.
They had at least a son and a daughter:
 Sultanzade Fülan Bey. He married his cousin Hanzade Hanımsultan, the daughter of Selçuk Sultan (daughter of Bayezid II).
 Şahzade Aynişah Hanımsultan. She married Abdüsselâm Çelebi.

See also
 List of Ottoman governors of Egypt

References

Ottoman governors of Egypt
1524 deaths
Executed people from the Ottoman Empire
16th-century Ottoman governors of Egypt
16th-century executions by the Ottoman Empire
Pashas
Year of birth unknown
People executed by the Ottoman Empire by decapitation
Georgians from the Ottoman Empire
Executed monarchs
Rebels from the Ottoman Empire